Steve Millen (born 17 February 1953) is a retired New Zealand IMSA race car driver. In the 1970s and 1980s, Millen raced in hillclimbing and Formula Ford before doing stadium off-road racing in the United States in the Mickey Thompson Entertainment Group (MTEG). He then began sports car racing, winning numerous championships in IMSA Camel GT. Millen won 20 races in the series, including the 24 Hours of Daytona and the 12 Hours of Sebring.

Racing career
Millen began his racing career in hillclimbing in 1969. He then moved to the Formula Ford series. He started competing in rally cars in the mid 1970s. He switched to off-road racing in the Mickey Thompson Entertainment Group (MTEG) stadium series in the early 1980s. He won the 1986, 1988, and 1989 Mickey Thompson Off-Road Grand Prix Grand National Sports Truck Championships. He also won two Indy Lights races in the series' inaugural 1986 season, that same year, he also participates in the last round of the World Rally Championship in the 21st Olympus Rally driving for Toyota Team Europe, accompanying the Swedish drivers Björn Waldegård and Lars-Erik Torph.

Millen switched to the IMSA Camel GT series in 1990. He was the 1990 24 Hours of Le Mans Rookie of the Year. He won three races and took five pole positions in 1990. He had seven poles and five wins in 1991.  He also drove for Allan Moffat Racing in the 1991 Tooheys 1000 at Bathurst, partnering Gary Brabham in a Ford Sierra RS500 but the car did not finish the race. Millen expressed interest in returning by no offer was forthcoming with the Moffat team seeing the return of the cars builder Ruedi Eggenberger in 1992 along with his ace driver Klaus Niedzwiedz.

Millen won the 1992 IMSA GTS championship in a Nissan 300ZX Twin Turbo car. He won the 12 Hours of Sebring and had top five finishes in the first four events before his 1993 season ended with injuries at Watkins Glen International.

Millen returned in 1994, and won the IMSA GTS championship. He won the 1994 24 Hours of Daytona and 12 Hours of Sebring, and was first in class at the 24 Hours of Le Mans.

In 1995, Millen won the 12 Hours of Sebring. He was invited to the International Race of Champions (IROC). He was leading the IMSA GTS championship, when he had a professional career-ending crash at Road Atlanta. He had competed in three of four IROC races.

Millen has the most all-time wins in IMSA GTS history with 20 victories. His 23 pole positions are also a series record. 

He has had several wins in occasional appearances in various series since his retirement.

Millen also worked as a driver for commercials sometimes with Rod and has appeared in a commercial for Honda, despite being under contract at the time to rival Nissan. He is also a member of the Screen Actors Guild as a stunt driver, which provided the healthcare he needed when he had his career ending crash.

Business career
He started Stillen, an aftermarket performance parts company specializing in Nissan and other performance vehicles in 1986. During the 1990s, Millen offered a line of customized high performance Chevrolet Suburban SUVs, and several modified Nissan special edition vehicles.
Millen has also been active in designing and engineering race cars for hill climbing, notably the Pikes Peak and Race to the Sky hillclimb in Queenstown, New Zealand.

Racing family
Steve's brother Rod Millen became a legend at the Pikes Peak International Hillclimb. Steve is the uncle of Rhys and Ryan who both compete in motorsport events.

Motorsports career results

International Race of Champions
(key) (Bold - Pole position. * – Most laps led.)

24 Hours of Le Mans results

Bathurst 1000 results

See also
Stillen
Rod Millen
Rhys Millen
Nissan

References

External links
Stillen website

Images
Profile and results of Steve Millen, Rallybase.nl
rallye-info profile on Steve Millen

1953 births
Tasman Series drivers
International Race of Champions drivers
Indy Lights drivers
Atlantic Championship drivers
SCCA Formula Super Vee drivers
Living people
New Zealand racing drivers
New Zealand rally drivers
24 Hours of Le Mans drivers
24 Hours of Daytona drivers
12 Hours of Sebring drivers
Australian Endurance Championship drivers